Robert Ayres (11 December 1914 – 5 November 1968) was an American film, stage and television actor. He worked mainly in Britain.

His stage work included Edward Albee's The American Dream and The Death of Bessie Smith at London's Royal Court Theatre in 1961.

Selected filmography

 They Were Not Divided (1950) - American Brigadier
 State Secret (1950) - Arthur J. Buckman
 To Have and to Hold (1951) - Max
 Night Without Stars (1951) - Walter
 The Black Widow (1951) - Mark Sherwin (The Amnesiac)
 13 East Street (1952) - Larry Conn
 24 Hours of a Woman's Life (1952) - Frank Brown
 Cosh Boy (1953) - Bob Stevens
 The Wedding of Lilli Marlene (1953) - Andrew Jackson
 River Beat (1954) - Captain Watford
 Delayed Action (1954) - Ned Ellison
 A Prize of Gold (1955) - Tex
 Contraband Spain (1955) - Mr. Dean, American Embassy superior
 It's Never Too Late (1956) - Leroy Crane
 The Baby and the Battleship (1956) - American Captain (uncredited)
 Operation Murder (1957) - Larry Winton
 The Story of Esther Costello (1957) - Mr. Wilson
 Time Lock (1957) - Insp. Andrews
 Cat Girl (1957) - Dr. Brian Marlowe
 The Depraved (1957) - Colonel-in-chief
 A Night to Remember (1958) - Maj. Arthur Peuchen
 First Man into Space (1959) - Capt. Ben Richards
 John Paul Jones (1959) - John Adams
 A Woman's Temptation (1959) - Mike
 Date at Midnight (1959) - Gordon Baines
 Transatlantic (1960) - Hotchkiss
 The Road to Hong Kong (1962) - American Official
 Two and Two Make Six (1962) - Col. Robert Thompson
 The Sicilians (1963) - Angelo Di Marco
 The Heroes of Telemark (1965) - General Courts
 Woman's Temptation (1966) - Mike
 The 25th Hour (1967)
 Battle Beneath the Earth (1967) - Adm. Felix Hillebrand
 Isadora (1968) - (uncredited) (final film role)

Death
Ayres died at age 53 on 5 November 1968 in Hemel Hempstead, Hertfordshire, England.

References

External links
 

1914 births
1968 deaths
American male stage actors
American male film actors
American male television actors
20th-century American male actors
Male actors from Missouri